Sex & Agriculture: The Very Best of The Exponents is a greatest hits collection by the New Zealand band The Exponents, released in November 2005. This two CD set has their hit singles on CD1 and a collection of B-sides and rarities on CD2. The album reached #7 and spent 15 weeks on the New Zealand Album chart. It included two new recordings, "Geraldine" and "Or A Girl I Knew", which were produced by Neil Finn at Roundhead Studios in Auckland.

Track listing
CD1
"Victoria" (single version)
"Airway Spies"
"All I Can Do" (single version)
"Know Your Own Heart"
"Your Best Friend Loves Me Too"
"I'll Say Goodbye (Even Though I'm Blue)"
"Sex & Agriculture"
"Christchurch (In Cashel St, I Wait)"
"My Love For You"
"Only I Could Die (And Love You Still)"
"Caroline Skies"
"Why Does Love Do This To Me?"
"Who Loves Who The Most"
"Whatever Happened To Tracey"
"Sink Like A Stone"
"Like She Said"
"La La Lulu"
"Geraldine"
"Or A Girl I Knew"

CD2
"It Means I Mean You"
"Fuck"
"Interesting Thing"
"What's Left Of Love"
"Are You Sure?"
"Close"
"Hey Girl Groove!"
"Only Virtually Mine"
"So This Is Love"
"Sadness"
"One Sad River"
"Do You Feel In Love"
"Helen"
"Galaxy"
"Blue River Rising"
"Poland" (original version)
"My Date With You Was A Date With No One" (live)
"Perfect Romance" (live)
"It Didn't And It Does"

Charts

References 

2005 greatest hits albums
The Exponents albums
Universal Music Group compilation albums
Albums recorded at Roundhead Studios